Nashville Community High School is a public high school located in Nashville, Illinois. The school educates about 400 students in grades 9 to 12.

Notable alumni 
Kirk Rueter - Retired pitcher for the Montreal Expos and the San Francisco Giants. Is the Giants franchise record holder for career wins by a left-handed pitcher in the San Francisco Era, and a member of the San Francisco Giants Wall of Fame.

Royce Newman - Current offensive lineman for the Green Bay Packers.

Athletics 

The Hornets and Hornettes, the school's athletic teams, compete in the Southern Illinois River-to-River Conference and have won 7 Illinois High School Association championships, 3 of them in softball.  They have also had 7 runner-up appearances, 9 3rd-place finishes, and 7 4th-place finishes.

 Baseball:  4th, 1994 (Class A)
 Boys Basketball:  4th, 1949; State Champions, 1978 (Class A); 2nd, 2014 (Class 2A), 2019 (Class 2A)
 Football:  2nd, 1998 (Class 3A), 2019 (Class 2A), 2021 (Class 2A)
 Boys Track:  2nd, 1997 (Class A); State Champions, 1998 (Class A - tied with Chicago Leo)
 Boys Golf:  3rd, 2013 (Class 1A); 3rd, 2014 (Class 1A)
 Girls Basketball:  3rd, 1989 (Class A); 2nd, 1990 (Class A); 4th, 2002 (Class A); 3rd, 2009 (Class 2A); 3rd, 2010 (Class 2A); 4th, 2011 (Class 2A); State Champions, 2013 (Class 2A)
 Girls Golf:  3rd, 2010 (Class A); 2nd, 2011 (Class A); State Champions, 2013 (Class A); 2nd, 2016 (Class 1A); 3rd, 2017 (Class 1A)
 Softball:  4th, 1999 (Class A); State Champions, 2001 (Class A); 3rd, 2004 (Class A); State Champions, 2012 (Class 2A); 3rd, 2013 (Class 2A); State Champions, 2015 (Class 2A)
 Volleyball: 4th, 2018 (Class 2A)

References

External links 
Nashville Community High School District 99 website

Public high schools in Illinois
School districts in Illinois
Schools in Washington County, Illinois
Education in Washington County, Illinois
1954 establishments in Illinois
School districts established in 1954